Union Landing Shopping Center is an open-air shopping mall in Union City, California with over 70 stores, restaurants, entertainment, hotels, and services. This is a 1,000,000 square-foot lifestyle center and is the largest shopping center in Union City. The majority of this area was occupied by Union City Drive-In Theater between 1966 and 1998. In June 2019, some of the retail buildings and restaurants were painted and remodeled along with street light banners which were added in 2021. The main stores are Walmart, Lucky, Ross Dress For Less, Michaels, Best Buy, Lowe's, Petco, Century Theatres (direct descendant of the original owners of the Union City Drive-In), Burlington Coat Factory, Video only, Flor marijuana dispensary store, both new stores will open in 2021. The mall was completed in 1999 after several years of debate on the land.

References

External links
 https://unionlanding.com/

Union City, California
Shopping malls in Alameda County, California
Shopping malls established in 1999
1999 establishments in California